Agustí Montal i Galobart was a president of the FC Barcelona for the years 1946 to 1952. Born in Barcelona in 1906 and died in 1964.

After the Spanish Civil War and during the early years of the Dictatorship by Francisco Franco, between 1939 and 1953, the president was appointed by the authorities of the regime. Montal's presidency began on 20 September 1946. But success came only in 1952, when the team under the command of Ferdinand Daucik during a season won five titles - La Liga, the Spanish Cup, Copa America, the Trofeo Martini Rossi and the Copa Eva Duarte. This resulted in a significant increase in the Barca fans, so he decided to buy land to build a new stadium - the Camp Nou, since Les Corts was too small to accommodate a growing group of followers. On 16 July 1952 Montal resigned as chairman to be replaced by Enric Martí Carreto.

His son Agustí Montal i Costa was also chairman of the 1966 Barcelona 1977.

See also
 List of FC Barcelona presidents

References

External links
 

20th-century Spanish businesspeople
People from Barcelona
FC Barcelona presidents
1906 births
1964 deaths